Sir Juckes Granville Juckes-Clifton, 8th Baronet (1769—1852) was 8th Baronet Clifton of Clifton, Nottinghamshire. and High Sheriff of Nottinghamshire in 1820.

Family
He was the second son of Sir Gervase Clifton, 6th Baronet, and wife Frances. He was educated at Rugby School.

He married in 1794 Margaret de Lancy, daughter of James de Lancy of Bath. They had no children.

He married again in 1821, to Marianne Swinfen (d 1860), daughter of John Swinfen of Swinfen, Staffordshire. The children from this marriage were:
Sir Robert Juckes Clifton, later 9th Baronet
Marianne Margaret Clifton (d 1891), married in 1842 the Rt Hon. Sir Henry Hervey Bruce, 3rd Baronet (d 1907), of Downhill, co. Londonderry

Career
In 1790 he inherited the estate of his great-uncle the Rev. Juckes Egerton, of Trelydon, Montgomeryshire, and assumed by Royal Licence the sole surname of Juckes.

He succeeded his brother Sir Robert Clifton, 7th Baronet as 8th Baronet in 1837, and consequently took the additional surname of Clifton by Royal Licence. He courted local controversy when he attempted to close off public access to the Clifton Grove walk on his estate and after a public outcry, this was abandoned.

He served as High Sheriff of Nottinghamshire in 1840.

Sir Juckes restored St. Mary's Church, Clifton at his own expense in 1852.

References

1769 births
1852 deaths
Baronets in the Baronetage of England
People from Nottingham
People educated at Rugby School
High Sheriffs of Nottinghamshire
Juckes